Trichostemma is an unaccepted scientific name and may refer to two different genera:
 Polymastia (sponge),  genus of sea sponges
 Wedelia, a genus of sunflowers